Peter R. Ghosh (born December 1954, Sutton Coldfield) is a British historian, specialising in the history of ideas and historiography.

Career

Ghosh has been Jean Duffield Fellow in Modern History at St Anne's College, Oxford since 1982.
He is also an associate professor of Modern History in the University of Oxford.

He has two related research interests: first, the interface between political ideas and English politics, c. 1850 – 1895; secondly, the evolution of Western European and British ideas, including historiography, from the Enlightenment to the present.

He has written for the London Review of Books and appeared on In Our Time discussing Max Weber.

Personal life

Peter Ghosh is married to Dame Helen Ghosh.

Works
 Politics and Culture in Victorian Britain: Essays in Memory of Colin Matthew (2006)
 A Historian Reads Max Weber: Essays on the Protestant Ethic (2008)
 Max Weber and 'The Protestant Ethic': Twin Histories (2014)
 Max Weber in Context: Essays in the History of German Ideas C. 1870-1930 (2016)

References

British historians
1954 births
Living people